Orange Line may refer to:

Public transit in Asia
Orange Line or Delhi Airport Metro Express in Delhi, India
Orange Line (Jaipur Metro) in Jaipur, India
Orange Line (Kanpur Metro), in Kanpur, India
Orange Line (Nagpur Metro), in Nagpur, India
Orange Line (Namma Metro) a planned line in Bengaluru, India
Orange Line (Lahore Metro) in Lahore, Pakistan
Orange Line, KMRT, Kaohsiung, Taiwan
Orange Line (Bangkok), a planned line in Bangkok, Thailand
Seoul Subway Line 3, Seoul, South Korea
Tung Chung line, Hong Kong, China
Zhonghe-Xinlu Line of  Taipei Metro, Taipei, Taiwan
PNR Metro South Commuter Line, Manila, Philippines
Ampang Line, Kuala Lumpur
Circle MRT line, Singapore

Public transit in Europe
Kaluzhsko-Rizhskaya line, Moscow, Russia
London Overground, London, UK
Paris Métro Line 5, Paris, France
Brussels Metro line 2, Brussels, Belgium
Line 7 (Madrid Metro), Madrid, Spain
Barcelona Metro line 9, Barcelona, Spain
U9 (Berlin U-Bahn), Berlin, Germany

Public transit in North America
 Broad Street Line, Philadelphia, Pennsylvania
 C Line (RTD), Denver, Colorado
 Eglinton Crosstown line, a light rail line currently under construction in Toronto, Ontario, Canada
 MAX Orange Line, a light rail line in Portland, Oregon
 Orange Line (CTA), Chicago, Illinois
 Orange Line (Dallas Area Rapid Transit), a light rail line in Dallas, Texas
 G Line (Los Angeles Metro), a busway line in Los Angeles, California formerly known as Orange Line
 Orange Line (MBTA), Boston, Massachusetts
 Orange Line, Metrorail, Florida
 Metro Orange Line (Minnesota), a planned bus rapid transit line serving Minneapolis, Minnesota
 Orange Line (Montreal Metro), Montreal, Quebec, Canada
 Orange Line (San Diego Trolley), San Diego, California
 Orange Line (Sound Transit), a streetcar line in Tacoma, Washington, United States
 Orange Line (Washington Metro), Washington, DC
 Richmond–Fremont line, San Francisco Bay Area, California
 Viva Orange, York Region, Ontario, Canada
 IND Sixth Avenue Line in New York City, colored orange on maps, which carries the B D F M trains
 Orange Line (VTA), a light rail in Santa Clara County, California
 Orange Line (Capital Metro), a planned light rail line in Austin, Texas

Road transportation
 Orange Belt (Pittsburgh), Pittsburgh, Pennsylvania

See also 
 Orange B Line
 Orange D Line
 Orange F Line
 Orange Flag Line
 Orange M Line
 Gold Line (disambiguation)
 Red Line (disambiguation)
 Yellow Line (disambiguation)